Muniswamy Venu (born 20 April 1946) is an Indian boxer. He competed in the men's lightweight event at the 1972 Summer Olympics. At the 1972 Summer Olympics, he won his first fight, against Neville Cole of Great Britain, before losing to Samuel Mbugua of Kenya.

References

1946 births
Living people
Indian male boxers
Olympic boxers of India
Boxers at the 1972 Summer Olympics
Place of birth missing (living people)
Asian Games medalists in boxing
Boxers at the 1970 Asian Games
Boxers at the 1974 Asian Games
Asian Games silver medalists for India
Asian Games bronze medalists for India
Medalists at the 1970 Asian Games
Medalists at the 1974 Asian Games
Commonwealth Games medallists in boxing
Commonwealth Games bronze medallists for India
Boxers at the 1974 British Commonwealth Games
Lightweight boxers
Recipients of the Arjuna Award
Medallists at the 1974 British Commonwealth Games